The Linux Phone Standards Forum (LiPS Forum) is a consortium of a group of companies to create standards for the use of Linux on mobile devices. The main goal of the LiPS Forum is to create application programming interfaces (APIs) that will allow developers to build applications to inter-operate across Linux handsets made by all manufacturers. Founding members include ARM Ltd, Cellon, Esmertec, France Telecom, Telecom Italia, FSM Labs, Huawei, Jaluna, MIZI Research, MontaVista Software, Open-Plug and PalmSource (in March 2007, PalmSource changed its name to that of its parent company, Access Inc).

Newer members include Texas Instruments, Trolltech ASA, and Movial Oy. British Telecom joined the LiPS Forum in September 2007.

In September 2007, the LiPS forum announced that it was going to align its efforts with those of the Open Mobile Alliance.

In June 2008, the LiPS forum announced that it would join with the LiMo Foundation and thereby cease to exist as a separate organization.

See also
 Mobile Linux Initiative

References

External links
 https://web.archive.org/web/20081220113941/http://lipsforum.org/

Linux organizations
Mobile phone standards
Mobile Linux